Jozef Urblík (born 3 January 1970) is a retired Slovak football striker.

References

1970 births
Living people
Slovak footballers
FK Slovan Duslo Šaľa players
Partizán Bardejov players
FC VSS Košice players
FC Hradec Králové players
MŠK Rimavská Sobota players
FC Baník Prievidza players
Hapoel Be'er Sheva F.C. players
Association football forwards
Czech First League players
Slovak expatriate footballers
Expatriate footballers in the Czech Republic
Slovak expatriate sportspeople in the Czech Republic
Expatriate footballers in Israel
Slovak expatriate sportspeople in Israel